David Boylen (born 26 October 1947) is an English former professional footballer who played as a midfielder, who later became a politician.

Career

Football 
Born in Prestbury, Cheshire, Boylen was playing non-league football with Ryder Brow when he signed a professional contract with Grimsby Town. At Grimsby between 1966 and 1978, Boylen made 384 appearances in the Football League, scoring 34 goals in the process. Boylen was part of the 1971–72 team that won the Division Four title. He later played non-League football with Skegness Town.

Politics 
Boylen served as a Liberal Democrat councillor for the Freshney ward of North East Lincolnshire Council from 2007 to 2011.

Honours
Grimsby Town
Fourth Division champions: 1971–72

References

External links
 

1947 births
Living people
People from Prestbury, Cheshire
English footballers
Association football midfielders
Grimsby Town F.C. players
Skegness Town A.F.C. players
English Football League players
Liberal Democrats (UK) councillors
Councillors in the Borough of North East Lincolnshire
21st-century English politicians